Landmark Credit Union is a not-for-profit financial cooperative in Southern Wisconsin that is owned by its customer/members.

History 
In February 1933, a group of employees at Rex Chainbelt Company (later Rexnord Corporation) pooled their funds together to form Rex #2 Credit Union to provide financial services to Rex Chainbelt Company employees.

Over the years, the credit union changed names (Chabelco Credit Union, Rexnord Credit Union). Then, in 1985, the credit union extended its scope to people living or working within the greater Milwaukee area. This event prompted the name change to Landmark Credit Union.

Landmark has grown to more than 30 branches and has over $5 billion in total assets. It serves those who live and work in Southern and Northeastern Wisconsin, plus Lake and McHenry Counties in Illinois.

Mergers and acquisitions 
Hartford Savings Bank, Badger Campus Credit Union, Dodge Central Credit Union (2013); Horizon Credit Union, Co-operative Credit Union, People's Credit Union, American Credit Union (2012); Lifetime Credit Union, Allco Credit Union, First Security Credit Union (2009), WISCOR Credit Union (2008); Belle City Credit Union (2007); County Wide Credit Union (2000); CityFirst Credit Union (1998); Waukesha Credit Union (1989); Brookfield Metco Community Credit Union (1988); New Berlin Industrial Credit Union (1987); Lake Country Credit Union (1986)

Membership eligibility 
Landmark Credit Union serves people living or working in Southern Wisconsin and Northeastern Illinois and their immediate family members.

Southern Wisconsin includes the following counties: Brown County, Calumet County, Columbia County, Dane County, Dodge County, Fond du Lac County, Green County, Green Lake County, Iowa County, Jefferson County, Kenosha County, Manitowoc County, Marquette County, Milwaukee County, Outagamie County, Ozaukee County, Racine County, Rock County, Sheboygan County, Walworth County, Washington County, Waukesha County, Winnebago County

Northeastern Illinois includes the following counties: McHenry County, Lake County

References

External links 
 Landmark's official website

Credit unions based in Wisconsin
Banks established in 1933
Companies based in Milwaukee
1933 establishments in Wisconsin
Financial services companies of the United States
Banks based in Wisconsin
Financial services
Companies established in 1933
Financial services companies established in 1933